Statistics of Japan Soccer League for the 1977 season. This was the inaugural season of the Regional League promotion series, which replaced the Senior Cup as the source of the clubs promoted from the regional Japanese football leagues.

First Division

Promotion/relegation Series

Yomiuri promoted, Toyota Motors relegated.

Second Division

Promotion/relegation Series

Toshiba promoted, Furukawa Chiba relegated.

References
Japan - List of final tables (RSSSF)

 

1977
1
Jap
Jap